Antonio Durini, 7th Earl of Monza (6 June 1770 – 16 April 1850) was an Italian noble and politician. He was born in and was the first mayor of Milan.

References

1770 births
1850 deaths
Mayors of Milan
19th-century Italian politicians